Menaca is a genus of wasp.

Menaca may also refer to:

People
 Menaca (and de Menaca), a variant of the Basque surname Mena
 Ángel Meñaca, a soccer executive for Rayo Cantabria/Deportivo Rayo Cantabria recognized by Santander, Spain

Places
 MENACA, a country grouping for the Middle East, North Africa, and, Central Asia
 Meñaca, Basque, Spain; a town

See also

MENA, Middle East and North Africa
Menaka (disambiguation)